Information Based Architecture (IBA) is a partnership between architects Mark Hemel and Barbara Kuit, set up in London in 1998.

"Using the newest technologies the practice challenges conventional thinking and seeks to exploit new opportunities to enrich our cities with conceptually interesting, and well thought through environmentally responsible architecture". 

The practice specializes in large-scale architectural and urban projects. Having won several high-profile competitions, the most famous one being the design for the Canton Tower also called the 'Guangzhou TV astronomical and Sightseeing Tower'. This project is generally recognised as one of the most complex projects in the world today.

Vision 
IBA can be typified as both 'experimental' and 'progressive'. It constantly attempts to extend the boundaries of artistic design, while also introducing the newest digital technologies. The work was published and exhibited widely. In 2002 they were short listed for the Young Architects of the Year Award in the United Kingdom. They have received support by the Dutch Department of Trade and Industry and received several encouragement-grants by the Netherlands Foundation for Visual Arts, Design and Architecture.

"In contemporary architecture you see lots of forms that refer to nothing. And indeed, we want to make designs that are more 'informed'. At the same time, it could be anything. It’s a sort of biological process; you plant a seed that contains an awful lot of information. That seed then grows into something that is not determined in advance."

Currently based in Amsterdam, the Netherlands, IBA continues its work on both large and small projects in Europe and Asia. The work includes urban master-planning, architecture, landscaping and furniture design.

Partners
Mark Hemel teaches at the Architectural Association in London where he has been Unit-master since 1999, and a design tutor in the Environment & Energy Program.

Before setting up practice, Barbara Kuit worked as a local architect (Harper McKay) on projects of Philippe Starck in London; (the Sanderson and St Martin's Lane hotels), and subsequently worked for several years for Zaha Hadid on many projects among which; the Mind Zone in the Millennium Dome, London, the Contemporary Arts Center in Rome and Wolfsburg Science Center in Germany.

Main achievements 
IBA was shortlisted in 2002 for the Young Architects of the Year Award in the United Kingdom. In 2003 and 2004 the office received a scholarship for research from the Netherlands Foundation for Visual Arts, Design and Architecture.

Information Based Architecture's most important project to date is the Canton tower.

References

External links
Information Based Architecture

Architecture firms of the Netherlands
Companies established in 1998